Liechtenstein competed at the 2015 European Games, in Baku, Azerbaijan from 12 to 28 June 2015.

Archery

Athletics

Individual

Overall

Judo

Swimming

Men

Synchronised swimming

References

Nations at the 2015 European Games
European Games
2015